The Pact is a 2003 Australian film.

The movie was privately financed.

References

External links
 

2000s English-language films
2003 films
Australian thriller films
2003 thriller films
Films directed by Strathford Hamilton
2000s Australian films